Orion is a village in Henry County, Illinois, United States. The population was 1,861 at the 2010 census. It is the site for transmitters for many of the Quad Cities' radio and television stations, including KLJB, KWQC-TV, WMWC-TV, WQAD-TV, WQPT-TV and KQIN.  FM radio station transmitters include WLKU and WXLP.

History
Orion was laid out on December 26, 1853, by Charles W. Dean. Until 1867 it was called Deanington.

Geography
Orion is located at  (41.353260, -90.377229).

Demographics

According to the 2020 census, the village had a population of 1,754.  Of this, 1,826 (98.12%) were white, 16 (0.86) were two or more races, 11 (0.59%) some other race, 4 (0.21%) were Asian, 3 (0.16%) were American Indian or Alaska Native.  Of the population, 45 (2.42%) were Hispanic or Latino of any race.

Historic Places
Two Orion locations are listed in the National Park Service's National Register of Historic Places:
 Central Park Music Pavilion – 1208 5th Street
 West Water Tower and Ground Storage Tank – 310 11th Avenue

Schools
Public schools in Orion are governed by Orion Community Unit School District 223. While the districts educates pre-kindergarten through 12th grade, it does not account for private and non-profit preschools that are also available.

Elementary school
 C.R. Hanna

Orion High School

High school
 Orion High School

References

External links
Orion official website
Orion CUSD 223
Orion Gazette

Villages in Henry County, Illinois
Villages in Illinois